The 1990 480 km of Suzuka was the opening round of the 1990 World Sportscar Championship season, taking place at Suzuka Circuit, Japan. It took place on April 8, 1990.

Official results
Class winners in bold. Cars failing to complete 75% of the winner's distance marked as Not Classified (NC).

† - #27 Obermaier Primagaz was disqualified for being underweight in post-race inspection.

Statistics
 Pole Position - #36 Toyota Team Tom's - 1:48.716
 Fastest Lap - #3 Silk Cut Jaguar - 1:53.732
 Average Speed - 176.031 km/h

External links
 WSPR-Racing - 1990 Suzuka results

Suzuka
Suzuka